Flat Bay (Mi'kmaq: Epwikek) is a local service district and designated place in the Canadian province of Newfoundland and Labrador. It is a Mi'kmaq community in southwestern Newfoundland.

History
The exact reason for how the Mi'kmaq settled in Newfoundland is debated. Common theories include that the Mi'kmaq migrated to Newfoundland on their own behalf while other theories suggest that Europeans brought them to the island. Conflicts with the British led Chief Jeannot Pequidalouet to relocate his band from Cape Breton to Newfoundland in the 1760s.

The Mi'kmaq first established Flat Bay as a seasonal settlement where they maintained trade with European explorers and settlers. It was also settled by Acadians such as Germain LeBlanc (from Nova Scotia) and Andre Alexandre (who was 25% Mi'kmaq). Their descendants bear the anglicized surnames "White" and "Alexander" which are common in Flat Bay today. Another white settler was Benjamin Perrier, who emigrated from France. In 1818, Edward Chappell visited Newfoundland and found an elderly Mi'kmaq chief (possibly named "Old Tomma") and his band had been established in the area. They had been granted land by British authorities for being loyal to the British crown.

The community was historically split into Flat Bay West, Flat Bay East and St. Teresa's.

The Mi'kmaq typically lived in the island's interior for large portions of the year. Overhunting of the caribou followed the construction of a railway across Newfoundland in the 1890s. Low fur prices in the 1930s caused many Mi'kmaq to give up their traditional way of life and settle in permanent villages such as Flat Bay.

Geography 
Flat Bay is in Newfoundland within Subdivision C of Division No. 4.

Demographics 
Of its 210 residents, 115 individuals were identified as having First Nations origin (entirely or in part).

Government 
Flat Bay is a local service district (LSD) that is governed by a committee responsible for the provision of certain services to the community. The chair of the LSD committee is Frederick Nelma.

See also 
List of communities in Newfoundland and Labrador
List of designated places in Newfoundland and Labrador
List of local service districts in Newfoundland and Labrador
Qalipu Mi'kmaq First Nation Band

References 

Designated places in Newfoundland and Labrador
Local service districts in Newfoundland and Labrador